Clark County (county code CA) is a county located in the U.S. state of Kansas. As of the 2020 census, the county population was 1,991. Its county seat and most populous city is Ashland.

Geography

Adjacent counties
 Ford County (north)
 Kiowa County (northeast)
 Comanche County (east)
 Harper County, Oklahoma (southeast)
 Beaver County, Oklahoma (southwest)
 Meade County (west)

Major highways
Sources:  National Atlas, U.S. Census Bureau
 U.S. Route 54
 U.S. Route 160
 U.S. Route 183
 U.S. Route 283
 Kansas Highway 34

Demographics

As of the census of 2000, there were 2,390 people, 979 households, and 676 families residing in the county.  The population density was 2 people per square mile (1/km2).  There were 1,111 housing units at an average density of 1 per square mile (0/km2).  The racial makeup of the county was 95.77% White, 0.25% Black or African American, 1.13% Native American, 0.08% Asian, 1.88% from other races, and 0.88% from two or more races. Hispanic or Latino of any race were 4.02% of the population.

There were 979 households, out of which 30.20% had children under the age of 18 living with them, 60.30% were married couples living together, 6.20% had a female householder with no husband present, and 30.90% were non-families. 29.60% of all households were made up of individuals, and 17.00% had someone living alone who was 65 years of age or older.  The average household size was 2.39 and the average family size was 2.95.

In the county, the population was spread out, with 26.60% under the age of 18, 4.90% from 18 to 24, 23.10% from 25 to 44, 23.60% from 45 to 64, and 21.80% who were 65 years of age or older.  The median age was 42 years. For every 100 females there were 95.60 males.  For every 100 females age 18 and over, there were 88.50 males.

The median income for a household in the county was $33,857, and the median income for a family was $40,521. Males had a median income of $27,321 versus $20,833 for females. The per capita income for the county was $17,795.  About 11.30% of families and 12.70% of the population were below the poverty line, including 18.00% of those under age 18 and 10.20% of those age 65 or over.

Government

Presidential elections
Prior to 1944, Clark County was a swing county, backing the national winner in every presidential election from 1900 to 1940. From 1944 on, it has become a Republican stronghold in presidential elections aside from 1964 when Lyndon B. Johnson won the county as part of a nationwide landslide victory.

Laws
The Kansas Constitution was amended in 1986 to allow the sale of alcoholic liquor by the individual drink with the approval of voters, either with or without a minimum of 30% of sales coming from food. Clark County is one of 35 counties in the state that allows for the sale of liquor by the drink without the minimum food sales stipulation.

Education

Unified school districts
 Minneola USD 219
 Ashland USD 220

Communities

Cities
 Ashland
 Englewood
 Minneola

Unincorporated communities
 Acres
 Letitia
 Lexington
 Sitka

Ghost towns
 Appleton
 Cash City
 Vanham

Townships
Clark County is divided into six townships.  None of the cities within the county are considered governmentally independent, and all figures for the townships include those of the cities.  In the following table, the population center is the largest city (or cities) included in that township's population total, if it is of a significant size.

See also
 Dry counties
 Big Basin Prairie Preserve

References

Further reading

 Plat Book of Clark County, Kansas; Dick Mackey; 37 pages; 1909.

External links

County
 
 Clark County - Directory of Public Officials
Maps
 Clark County Maps: Current, Historic, KDOT
 Kansas Highway Maps: Current, Historic, KDOT
 Kansas Railroad Maps: Current, 1996, 1915, KDOT and Kansas Historical Society

 
Kansas counties
1867 establishments in Kansas
Populated places established in 1867